Stewart Crameri (born 10 August 1988) is a former professional Australian rules footballer who played for Essendon, Western Bulldogs and Geelong in the Australian Football League (AFL).

Early life
Crameri was selected by Essendon with the forty-third pick in the 2009 rookie draft. After spending three seasons with the Bendigo Bombers, Crameri was finally given a chance at senior football after strong rumors in 2008 that he would be drafted by Essendon.

In 2009, he was one of the few shining lights in a very dark year for the Bendigo Bombers who went through the season rooted to the bottom of the ladder and winless. He originally played for Maryborough Football Club in the Bendigo Football League, and unlike most Victorians in the AFL, did not play in the TAC Cup as a junior.

AFL career

Crameri made his AFL debut for Essendon against Collingwood in Round 20 of the 2010 AFL season.

Crameri has had a great 2011 season up forward for Essendon, kicking 34 goals and was the club's leading goalkicker. At the Crichton Medal, Essendon FC Best & Fairest, he was awarded the Matthew Lloyd Leading Goal Kicking Award, and was the Essendon Football Club Most Improved player for 2011.

For the 2012 season, Crameri has inherited the #12 guernsey formerly worn by Andrew Welsh, who retired at the end of the 2011 season.

The Goldfields Region Sports Association awarded Crameri the Jack Worrall Medal for the region's most outstanding sportsperson for 2011.

On Thursday 24 October 2013, it was announced that Crameri had been traded from Essendon to the Western Bulldogs in exchange for pick number 26 in the National Draft.

Crameri, along with 33 other past and present Essendon players, was found guilty of using a banned performance-enhancing substance, thymosin beta-4, as part of Essendon's sports supplements program during the 2012 season. He and his teammates were initially found not guilty in March 2015 by the AFL Anti-Doping Tribunal, but a guilty verdict was returned in January 2016 after an appeal by the World Anti-Doping Agency. He was suspended for two years which, with backdating, ended in November 2016; as a result, he served approximately fourteen months of his suspension and missed the entire 2016 AFL season, including the Bulldogs' premiership win in October.

Crameri played just two matches in 2017, before undergoing hip surgery which would ultimately sideline him for the remainder of the season.

Crameri was delisted by the Bulldogs at the conclusion of the 2017 AFL season, but was taken by the Geelong Cats in the 2017 rookie draft.

Statistics
 Statistics are correct to the end of the 2012 season.

|- style="background:#eaeaea;"
| 2010 ||  || 45 || 3 || 0 || 1 || 20 || 33 || 53 || 8 || 6 || 0.0 || 0.3 || 6.7 || 11.0 || 17.7 || 2.7 || 2.0
|- 
| 2011 ||  || 45 || 20 || 34 || 22 || 167 || 156 || 323 || 104 || 48 || 1.7 || 1.1 || 8.4 || 7.8 || 16.2 || 5.2 || 2.4
|- style="background:#eaeaea;"
| 2012 ||  || 12 || 18 || 32 || 29 || 132 || 116 || 248 || 75 || 40 || 1.8 || 1.6 || 7.3 || 6.4 || 13.8 || 4.2 || 2.2
|- class="sortbottom"
! colspan=3| Career
! 41
! 66
! 52
! 319
! 305
! 624
! 187
! 94
! 1.6
! 1.3
! 7.8
! 7.4
! 15.2
! 4.6
! 2.3
|}

References

External links

Living people
1988 births
Australian rules footballers from Victoria (Australia)
Essendon Football Club players
Geelong Football Club players
Western Bulldogs players
Maryborough Football Club players
Australian people of Italian descent
Doping cases in Australian rules football
Bendigo Football Club players